Pavel Vladimirovich Sultanov (born 17 July 1993) is a Russian footballer.

Career
He made his debut in the Russian First Division for FC Avangard Kursk on 28 October 2012 in a game against FC Fakel Voronezh.

References

External links
 Career summary by sportbox.ru 
 
 
 
 
 
 
 Pavel Sultanov at Crimean Football Union

1993 births
Living people
Russian footballers
Association football midfielders
Russian expatriate footballers
Expatriate footballers in Ukraine
Expatriate footballers in Belarus
Expatriate footballers in Poland
Expatriate footballers in Turkey
FC Baltika Kaliningrad players
FC Saturn Ramenskoye players
FC Lada-Tolyatti players
FC Slavia Mozyr players
Ruch Wysokie Mazowieckie players
FC Avangard Kursk players
Belarusian Premier League players
Crimean Premier League players
Torbalıspor footballers